Henrique de Sena Ben David (5 December 1926 – 4 December 1978) was a Portuguese footballer who played as a striker. He spent most of his career with Atlético Clube de Portugal.

References

External links

1926 births
1978 deaths
People from Mindelo
Cape Verdean people of Jewish descent
Portuguese sportspeople of Cape Verdean descent
Cape Verdean footballers
Portuguese footballers
Association football forwards
Primeira Liga players
Liga Portugal 2 players
G.D. Fabril players
Atlético Clube de Portugal players
Portugal international footballers